The Spires is a mountain range in the South West Wilderness, Tasmania, Australia.
It is situated east of the Denison River.  It lies to the west of the upper Gordon River, and north of Lake Gordon.

It is  difficult to access.

The Tasmap of the area is called the same name.

Notes

See also

 List of mountain ranges of Tasmania

Mountain ranges of Tasmania
South West Tasmania